The James Simon Gallery is a centrally located visitor center and art gallery between the reconstructed Neues Museum and the Kupfergraben arm of the Spree river on Museum Island in Berlin, Germany. Designed by architect David Chipperfield, the gallery is named after the  Henri James Simon (1851–1932) who brought worldwide fame to the Berlin State Museums with his lavish donations. As the ensemble's sixth building, the gallery has a prominent position at the site of the former Packhof designed by Karl Friedrich Schinkel, which was demolished in 1938, and its design is inspired by the construction history of Museum Island.

History 
Chipperfield's first designs for the James Simon Gallery featured plain cubes with a hull of satin glass and steel, causing various protests. In 2004, an official panel recommended to Parliament that the government abandon plans for the entrance building, which led to an extensive revision in 2007. The design of the reception building consisted of a stone basement, framed by a modern continuation of Friedrich August Stüler's colonnades at the Alte Nationalgalerie. 

Originally planned at a cost of $94 million, the $157 million project was completed in July 2019 and opened to the public after an opening ceremony on 13 July 2019. The gallery saw 26,000 visitors on its first opening day. It took over nine years to build and cost 134 million Euros, almost twice as much the planned budget of 71 million Euros.

Design 
Similar to the Louvre Pyramid, the James Simon Gallery is designed to receive the visitors for the island, offer them orientation, and direct them to the exhibits featured on the main circuit. A broad staircase leads up in three flights to an elevated plateau with a line of 70 white concrete columns that stand almost nine metres high but less than 30 centimetres thick. The building provides a 300-seat auditorium, with concrete walls cast in pleated acoustic folds; a media centre; a 600 sq metre space for temporary exhibitions; a bookstore; shops; cafés and restaurants for all of Museum Island.

References

External links 
  
Picture

Berlin State Museums
Museum Island
2019 establishments in Germany